Kuzi-Teshub (also read as Kunzi-Teshub) was a Neo-Hittite King of Carchemish, reigning in the early to mid-12th century BC, likely in 1180-1150 BC. He was the son of Talmi-Teshub, who was both the last viceroy of the Hittite Empire at Carchemish under Suppiluliuma II and a direct descendant of Suppiluliuma I. Kuzi-Teshub reigned in Carchemish as well as in the later Neo-Hittite city of Melid.

In Carchemish, Kuzi-Teshub succeeded his father in office, probably first as viceroy, according to royal seal impressions found at Lidar Höyük in 1985 on the east bank of the Euphrates river. Kuzi-Teshub then styled himself as Great King of Carchemish, suggesting that the central Hittite dynasty at Hattusa had collapsed by this time and that he viewed himself as the legitimate heir of the line of Suppiluliuma I. Kuzi-Teshub is also styled as Great King in later inscriptions from Melid. The next known Great King of Carchemish was Ir-Teshub.

Kuzi-Teshub is not proved to have ruled directly as King of Melid. On one hand, it is possible that he ruled directly in Melid, but on the other hand he may have installed his son Pugnus-mili I as the local ruler in Melid. Both Kuzi-Teshub and Pugnus-mili I are only known from inscriptions left by the autonomous kings of Melid, Runtiya and Arnuwanti I, who were sons of Pugnus-mili I and grandsons of Kuzi-Teshub. The references to Kuzi-Teshub in his grandsons' inscriptions may indicate that Melid had peacefully separated from Carchemish.

References

Literature 

 
 
 

Hittite viceroys of Carchemish
Syro-Hittite kings of Carchemish
12th-century BC rulers